Bachmayer is a German surname.  Notable people with the surname include:

Georg Bachmayer (1913–1945), German SS-Hauptsturmführer
Werner Bachmayer (born 1960), Austrian sprint canoer

See also
Peter "Beda" Bachmayer, drummer for the band ConFused5
Bachmayer, a character in Max Payne (series)

German-language surnames

de:Bachmayer